Roger D. McKellips (January 26, 1923 – August 18, 2017) was an American politician and banker. He was a member of the South Dakota Senate from 1977 to 1978 and then from 1981 to 1994; he was the minority leader of the senate from 1983 to 1992 and the majority leader from 1993 to 1994.

Background
McKellips was born in Alcester, South Dakota. He went to Morningside College. McKellips served in the United States Army Air Forces during World War II. He was stationed in China and India. McKellips moved with his wife and family to Lawrence, Kansas. He received his bachelor's degree in business from University of Kansas. He moved back to Alcester and worked in the banking business. In 2008, McKellips and his wife moved to Dow Rummel Village in Sioux Falls, South Dakota. McKellips passed away there in 2017.

References

External links

1923 births
2017 deaths
Democratic Party South Dakota state senators
Politicians from Lawrence, Kansas
People from Union County, South Dakota
Morningside University alumni
University of Kansas alumni
United States Army Air Forces personnel of World War II
American bankers
Businesspeople from South Dakota
20th-century American businesspeople